Ernest Lamar Sarra (September 11, 1904 – May 24, 1995) was an American football and basketball player and coach. Sarra was a prominent center for coach Tom Sebring's Florida Gators football team, captain of the 1926 team. He was a three-year football star and played four seasons of basketball. Sarra was then the coach of the Plant Panthers in the 1930s. He was once chairman of the governor's committee on school building construction. He played high school football at Gainesville High under Rex Farrior.

See also
 List of University of Florida Athletic Hall of Fame members

References

1904 births
1995 deaths
American football centers
American men's basketball players
Florida Gators baseball players
Florida Gators football players
Florida Gators men's basketball players
High school football coaches in Florida
Players of American football from Jacksonville, Florida
Basketball players from Jacksonville, Florida
Baseball players from Jacksonville, Florida